Nicole Rajoharison (born 22 August 1965) is a Malagasy swimmer. She competed in two events at the 1980 Summer Olympics.

References

1965 births
Living people
Malagasy female swimmers
Olympic swimmers of Madagascar
Swimmers at the 1980 Summer Olympics
Place of birth missing (living people)